The Institute for High Energy Physics (Institut de Fisica d'Altes Energies, IFAE) of Barcelona, Spain, is a Public Consortium between the
Generalitat de Catalunya (Government of the Autonomous Community of Catalonia) and the
Universitat Autònoma de Barcelona (UAB). It was formally created on July 16, 1991,
by Act number 159/1991 of the Generalitat. As an organization it is independent from both the
UAB and the Generalitat, ruled by its own Statutes, and governed by a Governing Board.
It is located on the campus of UAB in Bellaterra, Barcelona.

The IFAE has its own Titular Personnel as well as Associated Personnel consisting on members
of the Physics Department of UAB working on Particle Physics. It has also an agreement with
Universitat de Barcelona (dated 8/7/1992) which also allows the faculty of that university
working on Particle Physics to be Associated Personnel of IFAE.

The IFAE is also ascribed to the UAB as a University Institute (Act number 231/1995 of the
Generalitat) which allows its members to teach in its Doctoral Programme in Physics, and thus
benefits from a productive symbiotic relationship with this major education and research institution.

The institute is dedicated to forefront experimental and theoretical research in the fields of
high energy physics and high energy astrophysics as well as in related technologies.

Current projects
Detector construction, algorithm development and Monte Carlo simulation for the ATLAS experiment at the Large Hadron Collider (LHC) under construction at the CERN;
Experiment design and construction of the MAGIC high energy gamma-ray telescope, under operation since 2004 in the Canary Islands, Spain;
Design of the Cherenkov Telescope Array, a matrix of Cherenkov Telescopes ten times more sensitive than MAGIC.
Development of a novel X-ray detector technique for use in medical imaging;
Analysis of data from the T2K experiment in Japan.
Development of an Information Data Grid in connection with the LHC computing;
A number of projects in theoretical Particle Physics.

External links
 Official IFAE website—

Research institutes in Catalonia
Astrophysics institutes
Physics institutes
Science and technology in Catalonia
Autonomous University of Barcelona
Government of Catalonia
Research institutes established in 1991
1991 establishments in Spain
Theoretical physics institutes